Diplacus fremontii is a species of monkeyflower known by the common name Frémont's monkeyflower. It is native to California and Baja California, where it grows in mountain and desert habitat, especially moist or disturbed areas. It was formerly known as Mimulus fremontii.

Description
Diplacus fremontii is an annual herb with a thin stem growing 1 to 20 centimeters tall. The oval leaves are up to 3 centimeters long, the ones higher on the plant are hairy in texture. The tubular base of the flower is encapsulated in a wide, ribbed, hairy calyx of sepals with pointed lobes. The corolla of the flower is reddish-purple with a darker pink throat with a yellow spot. There are occasionally all-yellow flowers. The flower is one to two centimeters in length.

References

External links
Jepson Manual Treatment — Mimulus fremontii
USDA Plants Profile for Mimulus fremontii
Mimulus fremontii - Photo gallery

fremontii
Flora of California
Flora of Baja California
Flora of the California desert regions
Natural history of the California chaparral and woodlands
Natural history of the California Coast Ranges
Natural history of the Mojave Desert
Natural history of the Peninsular Ranges
Natural history of the Santa Monica Mountains
Natural history of the Transverse Ranges
John C. Frémont
Taxa named by Asa Gray
Flora without expected TNC conservation status